Blaine Iman Clausell (born January 31, 1992) is a former American football offensive tackle. He played college football for Mississippi State, where he was the starting left tackle for four years, and was signed by the Baltimore Ravens as an undrafted free agent in 2015. He has also played for the New England Patriots, Washington Redskins, and Carolina Panthers.

Professional career

Baltimore Ravens
Clausell signed with the Baltimore Ravens on May 2, 2015 after going undrafted in the 2015 NFL Draft. On May 12, the Ravens announced Clausell would receive a $10,000 signing bonus, the highest of any Ravens undrafted free agent. On September 4, 2015, he was waived by the Ravens.

New England Patriots
Clausell was signed to the New England Patriots' practice squad on September 7, 2015. On November 19, 2015, he was released by the Patriots.

Baltimore Ravens (second stint)
On November 20, 2015, Clausell was signed to the Ravens' practice squad. He signed a reserve/future contract with the Ravens on January 4, 2016. On September 3, 2016, he was released by the Ravens and was signed to the practice squad the next day.

Washington Redskins
Clausell signed with the Washington Redskins active roster on November 7, 2016. He was released by the Redskins on December 2, 2016.

Carolina Panthers
On December 13, 2016, Clausell was signed to the Carolina Panthers' practice squad. He signed a reserve/future contract with the Panthers on January 2, 2017.

On September 2, 2017, Clausell was waived by the Panthers and was signed to the practice squad the next day. He was promoted to the active roster on January 2, 2018. On August 31, 2018, Clausell was released.

Arizona Cardinals
On September 2, 2018, Clausell was claimed off waivers by the Arizona Cardinals. On October 30, he was waived.

References

Living people
1992 births
People from Mobile County, Alabama
Sportspeople from Mobile, Alabama
American football offensive linemen
Mississippi State Bulldogs football players
Baltimore Ravens players
New England Patriots players
Washington Redskins players
Carolina Panthers players
Arizona Cardinals players